Spectrum is the official publication of Adventist Forum and a non-official publication of the Seventh-day Adventist Church, published four times a year. It was established "to encourage Seventh-day Adventist participation in the discussion of contemporary issues from a Christian viewpoint, to look without prejudice at all sides of a subject, to evaluate the merits of diverse views, and to foster intellectual and cultural growth." It presents a theological point of view which tends to be from the liberal progressive Adventist viewpoint.

History 

Spectrum was founded in 1969. Molleurus Couperus, a physician in Loma Linda, California, was appointed the first editor.

The magazine published the transcripts of some discussions from the 1919 Bible Conference in the 1970s. Editor Roy Branson later reflected that "was the single most important issue" of the journal.

In 1998, Spectrum'''s offices moved from Takoma Park, Maryland, to Roseville, California.
The organization also maintains an active website focused primarily on original news reporting.

 Editors 
 1969–1975 Molleurus Couperus
 1975–1978 Roy Branson and Charles Scriven
 1978–1998 Roy Branson
 1998 – 2022 Bonnie Dwyer
 2022 - present, Alexander Carpenter

See also the "Meeting the Team" series of interviews, c. 2009.

 Internet presence 
Alisa Williams serves as managing editor of the Spectrum website. The website was majorly redeveloped in 2007. In December 2008, Spectrum reported that its website ranks second amongst "Adventist news and commentary oriented websites", topped only by the Adventist Review''.

See also

Progressive Adventism
List of Seventh-day Adventist periodicals

References 

Magazines established in 1969
Magazines published in California
Magazines published in Maryland
Quarterly magazines published in the United States
Roseville, California
Seventh-day Adventist magazines published in the United States